The Domaine du roy ("King's Domain") was a vast region of New France extending north from the shore of the Saint Lawrence River between the seigneurie of Les Éboulements (near the City of Quebec) and Cape Cormorant (near the present-day town Loudres) towards the Hudson Bay watershed, an area claimed by Great Britain as Rupert's Land, the territory covered an area of 460,000 km².

Established in 1652, the Domaine du roy was renamed "King's Domain" after the French and Indian War. A present-day regional county municipality in the Saguenay–Lac-Saint-Jean region of Quebec also inherited the name Le Domaine-du-Roy.

References

See also

 New France
 Military of New France
 Rupert's Land

New France
1652 establishments in the French colonial empire